Melville F. Whedbee (February 14, 1904 – July 11, 1974) was the 14th head football coach at Kentucky State University in Frankfort, Kentucky and he held that position for five seasons, from 1963 until 1967.  His career coaching record at Kentucky State was 24–18–2.

References

External links
 

1904 births
1974 deaths
Kentucky State Thorobreds football coaches
Sportspeople from Louisville, Kentucky